R. Wilson Scarff (June 15, 1926 – March 16, 2009) was an American politician from Maryland. He served in the Maryland House of Delegates, representing Harford County, from 1963 to 1974.

Early life
Ross Wilson Scarff was born on June 15, 1926, in Fallston, Maryland, to Addie (née Wilson) and G. Ross Scarff. He attended Harford County Public Schools.

Career
Scarff was a merchant. He served in the United States Army from 1951 to 1953.

Scarff was a Republican. Scarff served in the Maryland House of Delegates, representing Harford County, from 1963 to 1974.

Personal life
Scarff married Elizabeth Anne Koller. His wife died in 2006.

Scarff died on March 16, 2009, in Bel Air, Maryland. He was buried at Bel Air Memorial Gardens.

References

1926 births
2009 deaths
People from Fallston, Maryland
Republican Party members of the Maryland House of Delegates
United States Army soldiers